Pelle Elkjær Mattsson (born 4 August 2001) is a Danish professional footballer who plays as a midfielder for Silkeborg IF.

Club career

Silkeborg IF
Mattsson joined Silkeborg IF at the age of 13 from ØBG Fodbold in Silkeborg. On 7 February 2019, 17-year old Mattson signed a trainee-contract with Silkeborg, after good performances for the first team in training and in friendly games. Mattsson was supposed to continue on the club's U19 team and occasionally train with the first team. However, Mattsson was called up for three first team games, before he got his official debut for the team on 21 April 2019 against Hvidovre IF in the Danish 1st Division. Mattsson started on the bench, before replacing Ronnie Schwartz in the 89th minute.

Silkeborg won promotion to the Danish Superliga for the 2019–20 season. Mattsson made his debut in the highest football league in Denmark on 8 July 2020, the same day he signed his first 4,5-year professional contract with Silkeborg.

Personal life
Pelle's older brother, Magnus Mattsson, is also a footballer, playing for NEC Nijmegen in the Netherlands. Their father, Joakim Mattsson, who is from Sweden, is a football manager.

Honours
Silkeborg
 Danish 1st Division: 2019–20

References

External links
 Pelle Mattsson  at Silkeborg IF 
 
 Pelle Mattsson at DBU

2001 births
Living people
Danish people of Swedish descent
Danish men's footballers
Denmark youth international footballers
Danish Superliga players
Danish 1st Division players
Silkeborg IF players
Association football midfielders
People from Ærø Municipality
Sportspeople from the Region of Southern Denmark